Jima or JIMA may refer to:

Jima of Silla
Jima, Nepal
Jima, Kenya
Jima, a Japanese word for "island", as in Iwo Jima or Hachijō-jima
An alternative spelling for Jimma, Ethiopia

See also
Shima (disambiguation), also "island" in Japanese